Khobeyneh-ye Olya (also Romanized as Khobeyneh-ye ‘Olyā) is a village in Esmailiyeh Rural District, in the Central District of Ahvaz County, Khuzestan Province, Iran. At the 2006 census, its population was 19, in 4 families.

References 

Populated places in Ahvaz County